United Nations Security Council resolution 1421, adopted unanimously on 3 July 2002, after recalling all previous resolutions on the conflict in the former Yugoslavia, particularly resolutions 1357 (2001), 1418 (2002) and 1420 (2002), the council, acting under Chapter VII of the United Nations Charter, extended the mandate of the United Nations Mission in Bosnia and Herzegovina (UNMIBH) and authorised the continuation of the Stabilisation Force (SFOR) until 15 July 2002.

As with Resolution 1420 (2002), the United States expressed its concern at "politicised prosecutions" of its peacekeepers before the International Criminal Court (ICC), whose jurisdiction the country did not accept and Statute came into force on 1 July 2002. The extension of UNMIBH's mandate allowed more time for consultations regarding immunity for United Nations personnel who were nationals of countries that did not recognise the ICC.

See also
 Bosnian War
 List of United Nations Security Council Resolutions 1401 to 1500 (2002–2003)
 Yugoslav Wars

References

External links
 
Text of the Resolution at undocs.org

 1421
2002 in Bosnia and Herzegovina
 1421
July 2002 events